Saransoor is a Somali Samaale clan family, among the largest by population and by area, inhabiting a traditional territory in Somalia spanning from Qorahsin, Hiran, to Ras Kamboni, Lower Jubba. In Kenya's North Eastern Province, Saransor make up the majority of the inhabitants of Wajir and have a significant presence in Mandera County they also have large population in Marsabit County and Isiolo County and Nairobi. In Ethiopia, a majority of the population of Liben Zone is Saransor they have very large population in Afdher, Dollo, Shabelle, Jarar, Dira Dawa and Jijiga.

The Saransor comprise four major sub-clans include Gaalje'el, Degoodi, Masarre, and Issa Saransor.

References 

Somali clans